Brienzwiler railway station is a Swiss railway station in the municipality of Brienzwiler and the canton of Bern. Brienzwiler is a stop on the Brünig line, owned by the Zentralbahn, that operates between Interlaken and Lucerne.

Services 
The following services stop at Brienzwiler:

References

External links 
 
 

Railway stations in the canton of Bern
Brienzwiler
Zentralbahn stations